Keysight Technologies, or Keysight, is an American company that manufactures electronics test and measurement equipment and software. The name is a blend of key and insight. The company was formed as a spin-off of Agilent Technologies, which inherited and rebranded the test and measurement product lines developed and produced from the late 1960s to the turn of the millennium by Hewlett-Packard's Test & Measurement division.

Products
Keysight's products include hardware and software for benchtop, modular, and field instruments. Instruments include oscilloscopes, multimeters, logic analyzers, signal generators, spectrum analyzers, vector network analyzers, atomic force microscopes (AFM), automated optical inspection, automated X-ray inspection (5DX), in-circuit testers, power supplies, tunable lasers, optical power meters, wavelength-meters, electro-optic converters, optical modulation analyzers and handheld tools. In addition, it produces electronic design automation (EDA) software (EEsof division). It mainly serves the telecommunications, aerospace/defense, industrial, computer, and semiconductor industries.

In 2021, the United States Department of State fined Keysight $6.6 million for unauthorized sales of defense-related software to China, Russia, and 15 other countries from 2015 to 2018, in violation of the Arms Export Control Act and the International Traffic in Arms Regulations. According to the State Department, some of the sales posed a risk to national security, and the company had been notified of potential unauthorized data transactions in 2017. Keysight agreed to pay the fine and to hire a compliance officer to conduct future audits.

Research and development 
Since its launch in 2014, Keysight has increased its investment in R&D from approximately 12% to 16%, a percentage that represents more than double the investment in absolute dollars.

Awards
Keysight won the 2014 Global Frost & Sullivan award for market leadership with $300 million in instrumentation software revenue. The citation states R&D investment of 12% of revenue ($365 million in 2013) as an important factor.

In recent years, Keysight received a ranking of #46 on Forbes list of “American’s Best Midsize Companies.”

Keysight was recently ranked #46 on Fortune's 2022 100 Best Companies to Work for.

References

External links
 

 Top 12 public test and measurement companies by revenue
 New Keysight CEO kicks electronic measurement company into overdrive

Electronics companies established in 2014
American companies established in 2014
Companies listed on the New York Stock Exchange
Electronic test equipment manufacturers
Electronics companies of the United States
Hewlett-Packard
Instrument-making corporations
Corporate spin-offs
Power supply manufacturers
Manufacturing companies based in the San Francisco Bay Area
Companies based in Santa Rosa, California